Ghulewadi is a census town in Ahmednagar district in the Indian state of Maharashtra.

Demographics
 India census, Ghulewadi had a population of 19,371. Males constitute 55% of the population and females 45%. Ghulewadi has an average literacy rate of 72%, higher than the national average of 59.5%: male literacy is 76%, and female literacy is 66%. In Ghulewadi, 13% of the population is under 6 years of age.

References

Cities and towns in Ahmednagar district